Salisbury Mills–Cornwall station is a commuter rail stop on the Metro-North Railroad's Port Jervis Line, located in the Beaver Dam Lake section of the town of Cornwall in Orange County, New York, United States. The station is located at the northern end of the Moodna Viaduct, accessible from NY 94. Parking fees are charged on weekdays, with both permit and metered spaces available. Salisbury Mills–Cornwall station contains a large parking lot, lighting, elongated canopy and a mini high-level platform for wheelchair access to trains. 

The station, located on the former Erie Railroad Graham Line, a former freight-only bypass route, opened on April 18, 1983 when the Metropolitan Transportation Authority moved service off the former Erie main line to the Graham Line. The Erie formerly served the hamlet of Salisbury Mills via its Newburgh Branch from January 8, 1850 to April 25, 1936, and served Cornwall via the Newburgh Shortcut.

Station layout
The station has one track and a low-level side platform.

References

External links 

Happy 100th Birthday Moodna Viaduct Video taken August 2007 showing the span.

Metro-North Railroad stations in New York (state)
Railway stations in Orange County, New York
Cornwall, New York
NJ Transit Rail Operations stations
Railway stations in the United States opened in 1983
1983 establishments in New York (state)